The Paris School of Urban Planning (French: École d'urbanisme de Paris (EUP)) is a higher education and research institute, dependent of both the University of Marne-la-Vallée and the Paris 12 Val de Marne University.

Education

Programs

Master 1 
 Urbanism and Urban Planning

Masters 2 
The EUP offers 8 programs:

 Transportation and Mobility (in collaboration with École des Ponts ParisTech)
 Urban alternatives and experimental projects
 Development and territories: resources, policies and strategies
 Urban Planning and international expertise (European cities course: taught in English, Cities of the south course: taught in French)
 Programming and Management of Urban Projects
 Urban Environments: strategies, projects and services
 Housing and Urban Renewal
 Urban Development : projects and strategies

References 

 https://web.archive.org/web/20180408073544/http://www.cohesion-territoires.gouv.fr/discours-de-sylvia-pinel-inauguration-de-l-ecole-d-urbanisme-de-paris
 https://www.mastersportal.com/studies/197165/urban-regeneration-and-city-planning-in-europe.html, information about masters in Urban Planning at the EUP

External links 
 Official website

Research institutes in France
Higher education in France